Besana may refer to:
 Besana (surname), a surname
 Besana in Brianza,  a town and comune in the province of Monza and Brianza, northern Italy.
 Besana Group, an Italian company
 Palazzo Pozzi Besana, a Neoclassical style palace in Milan, Italy
 Rotonda della Besana, a late baroque building complex and former cemetery in Milan, Italy,